The (GS&WR) 0-6-4T were a set of 6 locomotives of two variants of the 0-6-4T arrangement designed by Alexander McDonnell.  When introduced in 1876 it was the first use of a 0-6-4 configuration in the British Isles.  The final four locomotives were to be designated GS&WR Class 203.

Design
The design utilised many existing components of the existing 0-6-0T and 0-4-4T designs. 18x24in cylinders were already being retrofitted to existing goods engines to cope with existing traffic needs.  The first two locomotives, Nos. 201 and 202, were built as back tanks holding water above the rear bogie and were particularly noted for adhesion problems with little weight on the front driving wheels.  The subsequent batch of four in 1880 were built with side tanks and being four tons heavier gave some improvement in adhesion.

Service
Experience with the 0-6-4T tanks was unusually disappointing for a McDonnel design.  Experience at Cork has shown they were extremely prone to slipping while the long frames and wheelbase were problematic in the tight curves of marshalling sidings; with the powerful thrust of the large cylinders not being able to be utillised.  Ivatt and Aspinall were to address these issues in a 0-6-0T design that was to become known as the GS&WR Class 201.

Withdrawals
The first two, Nos. 201 and 202, were withdrawn relatively early and their numbers reallocated to a pair of members of GS&WR Class 201 built in 1895 some eight years after the first four.  No. 204 was rebuilt as a 0-6-0T in 1914.  No. 205 and 206 were withdrawn in 1928 with No 203 lasting until 1940.

Notes and references

Notes

References

0-6-4T locomotives
Steam locomotives of Ireland
Railway locomotives introduced in 1876
5 ft 3 in gauge locomotives
Scrapped locomotives